William Woods Holden (November 24, 1818 – March 1, 1892) was an American politician who served as the 38th and 40th governor of North Carolina. He was appointed by President Andrew Johnson in 1865 for a brief term and then elected in 1868. He served until 1871 and was the leader of the state's Republican Party during the Reconstruction Era.

Holden was the second governor in American history to be impeached, and the first to be removed from office through that process. His impeachment was politically motivated due to his suppression of the Ku Klux Klan. After Republicans lost the 1870 election, Democrats impeached him on eight charges for supposed actions during the Kirk–Holden war. He is the only North Carolina governor to have been impeached. In 2011, Holden was posthumously pardoned by the North Carolina Senate.

Life

Early years
Holden was born on November 24, 1818, and raised near Hillsborough, North Carolina. At age of 10, he began a six-year apprenticeship with Dennis Heartt at the Hillsborough Recorder newspaper in Hillsborough, North Carolina. By age 19, Holden was working as a printer and writer at the Raleigh Star, in Raleigh, North Carolina. He then studied law, was admitted to the bar in 1841, and became a member of the Whig party.  However, he never practiced law and instead participated in the newspaper business.

In 1843, he became owner and editor of the North Carolina Standard in Raleigh. He changed the newspaper's party affiliation to the Democratic Party. When Holden took over the newspaper, it was struggling financially. Under his leadership, it became one of the most widely read newspapers in the state. He continued as owner and editor of the newspaper until he was elected governor.

Political career
In December 1843, Holden became a delegate to the Democratic state party convention, where he was elected to the North Carolina Democratic Party state executive committee. In 1846, Holden was elected to represent Wake County in the North Carolina House of Commons and chose to only serve one term. During the 1850 elections he served a major role in ending the Whig dominance in the state. By 1858, he was chairman of the party. That year, he unsuccessfully attempted to gain the Democratic gubernatorial nomination, but was defeated by John W. Ellis, and then his party passed him over for a Senate seat.

Throughout the 1840s and 1850s, Holden advocated for Southern rights to expand slavery and sometimes supported the right of secession, but by 1860 he had shifted his position to support the Union. Holden and his newspaper fell out of favor with the state Democratic Party, and he was removed as the state's printer when he editorialized against secession in 1860. In 1861, Holden was sent to a state convention to vote against secession representing Wake County.

As the Civil War progressed, Holden became critical of the Confederate government, and became a leader of the North Carolina peace movement. In 1864, he ran against incumbent Governor Zebulon B. Vance as a peace candidate, but Vance defeated him in a landslide receiving over eighty percent of the vote.

When the Civil War ended on May 9, 1865, Holden was appointed Governor on May 29, by President Andrew Johnson. During Reconstruction he served a major role in North Carolina and placed the Standard newspaper in the hands of his son, Joseph W. Holden. However, he was defeated by Jonathan Worth in a special election for governor in 1865.

Johnson then nominated Holden to be minister to El Salvador, but the Senate rejected his nomination, so he returned to editing the Standard, and became president of the North Carolina Union League, and organized the North Carolina Republican Party in 1866–67.

Governor

While voters were approving the new state constitution, Holden was elected governor at the head of the Republican ticket in 1868, defeating Thomas Samuel Ashe. When he was elected governor, Holden gave up editorship and ownership of the Standard.

To combat the Ku Klux Klan, Holden hired two dozen detectives from 1869 to 1870, and although the detective unit was not overly successful in limiting Klan activities, his efforts to suppress the Klan exceeded those of other Southern governors. With new powers granted to him by the state legislature under the 1870 Shoffner Act, he called out the militia against the Klan in 1870, imposed martial law in two counties, and suspended the writ of habeas corpus for accused leaders of the Klan in what became known as the Kirk–Holden war. The result was a political backlash, accompanied by violence at the time of the election to suppress the black vote. The Republicans lost the legislative election.

After the Democratic Party regained majorities in both houses of the state legislature in 1870, Governor Holden was impeached by the North Carolina House of Representatives on December 14, 1870. During his trial in the Senate he was defended by Nathaniel Boyden and William Nathan Harrell Smith, but he was convicted on six of the eight charges against him by Democratic members of the North Carolina Senate in party-line votes on March 22, 1871. Holden's son-in-law, state senator Lewis P. Olds, was among those who voted against removal. The other two charges received majority votes, but not the required two-thirds majorities.

The main charges against Holden were related to the rough treatment and arrests of North Carolina citizens by state militia officer Colonel George W. Kirk during the enforcement of Reconstruction civil rights legislation. Holden had formed the state militia to respond to the assassination of Republican senator John W. Stephens on May 21, 1870, and the lynching of Wyatt Outlaw, a black police officer in the town of Graham in Alamance County, as well as numerous attacks by the Ku Klux Klan.

Holden was the first governor in American history to be impeached, convicted, and removed from office. Governor Charles L. Robinson of Kansas was the first American governor to be impeached, however, without conviction and removal.

Later life
Following his impeachment and removal from office he moved to Washington, D.C., where he resumed working on the Daily Chronicle. In 1873, President Ulysses Grant appointed him as postmaster for Raleigh and he served until 1881. President James A. Garfield was later asked by Raleigh Republicans to not re-appoint him and Holden left the Republican party after losing his position.

Holden died on March 1, 1892, and was buried at Historic Oakwood Cemetery in Raleigh. He was recognized as "one of the foremost men in intellectual power and daring that were ever born here" by North Carolinian Walter Hines Page. In 2011, Holden was posthumously pardoned by the North Carolina Senate in a 48–0 vote.

References

Bibliography

Primary sources

Secondary sources (chronologically)
 
 
 
 
 
 , Fulltext online in Ebsco

External links
 

|-

|-

|-

1818 births
1892 deaths
19th-century American politicians
Activists from North Carolina
American anti-war activists
American proslavery activists
Burials at Historic Oakwood Cemetery
Governors of North Carolina
History of North Carolina
Holden family
Impeached state and territorial governors of the United States removed from office
Members of the North Carolina House of Representatives
North Carolina Democratic Party chairs
North Carolina Democrats
North Carolina politicians convicted of crimes
North Carolina postmasters
North Carolina Republicans
North Carolina Whigs
People from Durham County, North Carolina
People from Orange County, North Carolina
People of North Carolina in the American Civil War
People who have received posthumous pardons
Republican Party governors of North Carolina
Southern Unionists in the American Civil War
Washington, D.C., Republicans